Melekasovo (Mäläkäś) is a rural locality (a village) in Alegazovsky Selsoviet, Mechetlinsky District, Bashkortostan, Russia. The population was 259 as of 2010. There are 3 streets.

Geography 
Melekasovo is located 21 km west of Bolsheustyikinskoye (the district's administrative centre) by road. Salyevka is the nearest rural locality.

References 

Rural localities in Mechetlinsky District